Woodbridge is a hamlet in Dorset, England. The village is on the A3030 road and to the north east of Holwell.

History 
Woodbridge was part of the North Dorset district until 2019.

Politics 
Woodbridge is part of the West Dorset parliamentary constituency.

References 

Hamlets in Dorset
North Dorset District